The men's water polo tournament at the 2019 Southeast Asian Games was held at the New Clark City Aquatics Center, Tarlac, Philippines from 26 November to 1 December 2019. The competition was held in a round-robin format, where the top 3 teams at the end of the competition will win the gold, silver, and bronze medal respectively.

Indonesia won their very first gold medal in the competition by topping the round-robin eliminations, ending the defending champions Singapore's 54-year domination of the sport since 1965.

Competition schedule
The following was the competition schedule for the men's water polo competitions:

Squads

Results
All times are Philippine Standard Time (UTC+08:00)

Round-robin

See also
Women's tournament

References

men
Southeast Asian Games